Myers is an unincorporated community in central Treasure County, Montana, United States, along the Yellowstone River.  It lies along local roads west of the town of Hysham, the county seat of Treasure County.  Its elevation is 2,680 feet (817 m).  Myers' post office opened on October 31, 1911 and closed November 7, 1975.

References

Unincorporated communities in Treasure County, Montana
Unincorporated communities in Montana